Kanalski Vrh ( or ) is a village in the hills above Kanal in the Littoral region of Slovenia.

Name
The name of the settlement was changed from Vrh to Kanalski Vrh in 1952.

Church
The local church is dedicated to Saint Anthony the Hermit and belongs to the Parish of Kanal.

References

External links
Kanalski Vrh on Geopedia

Populated places in the Municipality of Kanal